The 2015 LEB Oro playoffs was the final stage of the 2014–15 LEB Oro season. They started on 28 April 2015, and ended on June 2.

The quarterfinals were played in a best-of-3 games format, while the semifinals and the finals in a best-of-5 games format. The best seeded team played at home the games 1, 2 and 5 if necessary. The winner of the finals had the option to promote to the 2015–16 ACB season with Ford Burgos, the champion of the regular season. Finally, Club Ourense Baloncesto won the playoffs but, as Ford Burgos, was not admitted in the Liga ACB.

Bracket

Quarterfinals

Club Ourense Baloncesto v Club Melilla Baloncesto

Ribeira Sacra Breogán Lugo v Quesos Cerrato Palencia

MyWigo Valladolid v Planasa Navarra

Palma Air Europa v Actel Força Lleida

Semifinals

Club Ourense Baloncesto v Actel Força Lleida

Ribeira Sacra Breogán Lugo v Mywigo Valladolid

Final

Club Ourense Baloncesto v Ribeira Sacra Breogán Lugo

References

LEB Oro playoffs
playoff